Gidea Park railway station is on the Great Eastern Main Line, serving the neighbourhood of Gidea Park in the London Borough of Havering, east London. It is  down the line from London Liverpool Street and is situated between Romford and Harold Wood. Its three-letter station code is GDP and it is in Travelcard zone 6.

History
The station, constructed in a cutting, was opened as Squirrels Heath & Gidea Park  on 1 December 1910 by the Great Eastern Railway on that company's main line out of London Liverpool Street. The station consisted of two island platforms with access via a footbridge, giving four platform faces despite the line being of two tracks beyond the station environs. The station signal box was elevated on a set of girders spanning the two central tracks, and there was a goods shed and coal staithes at the country end of the station on the south side of the line controlled by an additional signal box. Immediately beyond the goods facilities was the building known as the "Romford Factory" which had been the original locomotive works for the Eastern Counties Railway from 1843 until the opening of Stratford Works in 1847, and remained in use by the railway working on the manufacture and repair of canvas wagon sheets. The line through Romford and Gidea Park as far as Shenfield was quadrupled in 1930 to provide increased capacity and additional carriage sidings were added on the north side of the line opposite the goods facilities as part of these works. The order of words in the station name was switched to Gidea Park & Squirrels Heath in late 1913 and the "Squirrels Heath" suffix was dropped by British Rail in February 1969.

Accidents and incidents 
The Peterborough train was travelling at an estimated 30 to 35 mph on impact, which destroyed the rear three coaches of the Southend train. Seven people were killed in the crash and 45 were hospitalised. Two of the four lines through the station were reopened within two hours, and the other two followed the next day.

Elizabeth line
In 2017, new  trains began entering service as Crossrail partially opened under the TfL Rail brand. New lifts, signage, help points, customer information screens and CCTV were installed and the footbridge and carriage-sidings refurbished. Elizabeth line services began on 24 May 2022 and through services to Paddington commenced on 6 November 2022.

Design
The station has step-free access to all platforms and is accessibility classification category A.

Services
The following services typically call at Gidea Park during off-peak hours. Frequency is increased during peak times, with some additional trains between Liverpool Street and Gidea Park running in the peak direction only.

Connections
London Buses routes 294, 496 and school routes 649, 650 and 674 serve the station.

References

Further reading
 – describes the accident in 1947

External links

Railway stations in the London Borough of Havering
Former Great Eastern Railway stations
Railway stations in Great Britain opened in 1910
Railway stations served by the Elizabeth line